New York's 101st State Assembly district is one of the 150 districts in the New York State Assembly. It has been represented by Brian Maher since 2023, replacing Brian Miller, who represents District 122 following the 2021-22 redistricting process.

Geography 
District 101 includes portions of Delaware, Herkimer, Oneida, Orange, Otsego, Sullivan, and Ulster counties.

Recent election results

2022

2020

2018

2016

2014

2012

References

101
Delaware County, New York
Herkimer County, New York
Oneida County, New York
Orange County, New York
Otsego County, New York
Sullivan County, New York
Ulster County, New York